Pamekasan Regency is a regency (kabupaten) of the province of East Java, Indonesia.

Neighbouring Regencies 
Pamekasan Regency is bordered on the east by Sumenep Regency, on the north by the Java Sea, on the west by Sampang Regency, and on the south by the Madura Strait (separating Madura from the island of Java).

Administrative Districts 
Pamekasan Regency consists of thirteen districts (kecamatan), tabulated below with their areas and their populations at the 2010 census and the 2020 census. The table also includes the location of the district administrative centres, the number of administrative villages (rural desa and urban kelurahan) in each district, and its post code.

Demographics

The population comprises Madurese, Javanese, and Chinese Indonesians.

Economy

One of the famous produces from this region is Batik Pamekasan.

References

External links

Madura Island
Regencies of East Java